United Nations General Assembly Resolution ES‑11/3 is a resolution of the eleventh emergency special session of the United Nations General Assembly, adopted on 7 April 2022. The resolution suspended the membership of Russia in the United Nations Human Rights Council over "grave concern at the ongoing human rights and humanitarian crisis in Ukraine [...] including gross and systematic violations and abuses of human rights" committed by Russia, and was passed with 93 votes in favour, 24 against, and 58 abstentions.

Background 

On 1 April 2022, video footage of the Bucha massacre became public, linking the massacre to the Russian Armed Forces. On 4 April, citing the Bucha massacre, U.S. Permanent Representative to the United Nations Linda Thomas-Greenfield announced that the United States would seek the removal of Russia from the UN Human Rights Council. At the time, Russia was serving a three-year elected term on the Council.

Draft resolution A/ES-11/L.4 was introduced on 6 April 2022. Previously, only Libya had its membership rights stripped from the body, as a result of the actions of the Gaddafi regime against anti-government protestors in 2011. Prior to the vote, the Russian delegation to the United Nations privately circulated a letter urging countries not to vote in favour or to abstain on the resolution, stressing that doing so would impact bilateral relations.

Vote 
On 7 April 2022, the UN General Assembly, which required a two-thirds majority, adopted the resolution with 93 votes in favour and 24 countries voting against. 58 countries abstained. With Russia's membership valid through 2023, the Russian delegation announced it had quit the Human Rights Council earlier that day in expectation of the vote.

See also 

 Eleventh emergency special session of the United Nations General Assembly
 Legality of the 2022 Russian invasion of Ukraine
 United Nations General Assembly Resolution 68/262
 United Nations General Assembly Resolution ES-11/1
 United Nations General Assembly Resolution ES-11/2
 United Nations General Assembly Resolution ES-11/4
 United Nations General Assembly Resolution ES-11/5
 United Nations General Assembly resolution
 United Nations Security Council Resolution 2623

References

External links
 Text of resolution ES-11/3 at UN Digital Library 

United Nations General Assembly resolutions
Reactions to the 2022 Russian invasion of Ukraine
Russo-Ukrainian War
2022 in Russia
2022 in Ukraine
2022 in the United Nations
Ukraine and the United Nations
Russia and the United Nations
April 2022 events
Resolution